The Vrsar airport bombing was a Yugoslav Air Force strike on the Crljenka airport near Vrsar—an air sports airport in the Istrian peninsula. The airstrike occurred on 21 December 1991, possibly as an attempt to stop the training of Croatian pilots, who had deserted the Yugoslav airforce and were being trained in Vrsar. Other than being a training facility, the airport had a significant logistical value. However, since an attack was expected only on the more strategically important Pula Airport (which the JNA had evacuated a little over a month earlier) the airport had little defences, and the Croatians were caught unawares, with the alarm sounding ten minutes after the attack. Two people were killed in the raid, while the airport was damaged.

Background
The jet fighters that attacked Vrsar airport took to the air from the JNA-controlled airbase of Bihać, which was used intensively in 1991. The base had significant importance, with its strategically located "Celopek" intercept and surveillance radar on Mount Pljesevica, at the nerve center of an advanced integrated air defence network covering the airspace and territory of Yugoslavia. In addition to its main functions as a protected radar installation, control centre, and secure communications facility, the airbase contained tunnels housing two full fighter squadrons, one reconnaissance squadron, and associated maintenance facilities.

The airport from whence the Yugoslav Air Force attacked Vrsar would later be damaged on purpose by the withdrawing Yugoslav army. Indeed, during the withdrawal of the Yugoslav People's Army, the latter destroyed the runway of the airbase by filling pre-built spaces (designed for the purpose) with explosives and detonating them. To prevent any possible further use of the complex by Croatian and Bosnia-Herzegovinan forces, the Military of Serbian Krajina completed the destruction in 1992 by setting off an additional 56 tonnes of explosives. Residents of nearby villages claimed that smoke continued to rise from the tunnels for six months after the explosion.

An attack was expected on Pula, but not Vrsar. In November 1991, the JNA evacuated Pula Airport, leaving, however, the structure mined. Four bomb disposal experts (Dušan Bulešić, Stevo Grbić, Vicalj Marjanović and Marijan Vinković, members of the Ministry of the Interior and the 119th Istria Brigade) died in the process of demining, after the Croatians decided to relieve the airport. 
After tensions, night shootings, blackouts and air raids in November and December, the JNA definitively left Pula (and Istria) on 16 December 1991, just a few days before the bombing of the Crljenka, after a team of negotiators led by Luciano Delbianco managed to maintain peace while the city was occupied, avoid its destruction, and negotiate a peaceful removal of the JNA army. Peace in Pula was maintained, and success of the negotiations achieved, also thanks to the "presence of honorable men on the other side of the table": Admiral Pogačnik and Admiral Barović, with Barović famously stating "Any destruction won't be conducted here while I'm in command, and if I am still forced to order the destruction of Pula and Istria, then I will no longer be here." The evacuation of Istria by the JNA and the Yugoslav Navy handed over the Croatian TO weapons to the HV. The quantity of TO weapons handed over in Istria—where the JNA evacuated 78 facilities—was enough to arm two combat brigades.

Reason for the attack
The reason for the attack might have been thwarting the training of some pilots who had deserted the Yugoslav Air Force and were reportedly being trained in Vrsar. Other than being a training facility, the airport had "a significant logistical value for Istria." An attack on the Vrsar airport, however, was regarded as quite unlikely. As a result, the airbase of Vrsar was unequipped, had little air defences and a poor surveillance and reporting service.

Bombing

Although Istria was one of the less affected regions in the Croatian War of Independence, it was not spared from attacks.

It is believed that the Vrsar Bombing was carried out by the 124th Fighter Aviation Squadron of the 117th Fighter Aviation Regiment stationed at the Željava airbase. The aircraft took off from Bihać and flew in from the Lim Channel. 

Just before 1 pm, the seven (according to other sources 4 to 8) Mig 21 aircraft that had taken off from Bihać rocketed and bombed the Crljenka of Vrsar, dropping 250 kg bombs, two to four cluster bombs, eight to twelve 127 mm lighting rockets, ninety to one hundred 23 mm cannon shells and twenty-five to thirty 57 mm missels, as well as a napalm bomb that did not activate. Because, as mentioned, an attack on Vrsar airport was not expected, and the Crljenka had little air defences, while the "survaillance and reporting service did not respond in time," the alarm sounded ten minutes after the attack had begun.

Two people lost their lives in the bombing: Dragutin Barić, a member of the Croatian Air Force, and Dragan Garvan, a member of the Vrsar Aviation Group. As technicians at the beginning of the war, they were fixing up agricultural aircraft for combat operations and of defense. Debate as to why the airport of Vrsar was attacked instead of that of Pula continues to this day. Also, it remains unknown who ordered the attack.

A memorial cross was erected for the victims at the place where they were killed.

References

Sources

See also
 Pula Airport incident
 1995 Rijeka bombing

Croatian War of Independence
Airstrikes
1991 in Croatia
1990s in Croatia
December 1991 events in Europe